Paul Jamaine Washington Jr. (born August 23, 1998) is an American professional basketball player for the Charlotte Hornets of the National Basketball Association (NBA). He played college basketball for the Kentucky Wildcats.  After being selected by the Hornets in the first round of the 2019 NBA draft with the 12th overall pick, he was named to the NBA All-Rookie Second Team in 2020.

Early life
Washington attended Lone Star High School in Frisco, Texas before transferring to Findlay Prep in Henderson, Nevada.

Recruiting
Washington was rated as a five-star recruit and No.12 overall recruit and No.3 power forward  in the 2017 high school class by Scout.com, Rivals.com and ESPN. On November 10, 2016, he committed to the Kentucky Wildcats, on November 20 he signed his letter of intent.

College career
Throughout most of his freshman season at Kentucky, Washington played through a pinkie injury that required surgery in the summer. In the NCAA Tournament loss to Kansas State, Washington led Kentucky with 18 points and 15 rebounds. Washington averaged 10.8 points and 5.7 rebounds per game as a freshman. After the season, he declared for the NBA draft, but announced his return on May 30, 2018.

Following Kentucky's loss to Auburn in the 2019 NCAA men's basketball tournament, Washington announced his intention to forgo his final two seasons of collegiate eligibility and declare for the 2019 NBA draft, where he was projected to be a first-round selection.

Professional career

Charlotte Hornets (2019–present)
Washington was selected as the 12th overall pick by the Charlotte Hornets in the 2019 NBA draft. On July 3, 2019, Washington officially signed with the Hornets. On October 23, 2019, Washington made his debut in NBA, started in a 126–125 win over the Chicago Bulls with 27 points, 4 rebounds, an assist, a steal and a block. He also made 7 three-pointers, the most in an NBA debut in NBA history. On October 31, 2019, Washington scored 23 points and 8 rebounds in a 118–111 win over the Sacramento Kings. On November 29, 2019, Washington put up 26 points and 5 rebounds in a 110–107 victory against the Detroit Pistons. On September 15, 2020, Washington was named 2019–20 NBA All-Rookie Second Team by the NBA.

On February 28, 2021, Washington scored a career-high 42 points to help the Charlotte Hornets win over the Sacramento Kings.

Career statistics

NBA

Regular season

|-
| style="text-align:left;"|
| style="text-align:left;"|Charlotte
| 58 || 57 || 30.3 || .455 || .374 || .647 || 5.4 || 2.1 || .9 || .8 || 12.2
|-
| style="text-align:left;"|
| style="text-align:left;"|Charlotte
| 64 || 61 || 30.5 || .440 || .386 || .745 || 6.5 || 2.5 || 1.1 || 1.2 || 12.9
|-
| style="text-align:left;"|
| style="text-align:left;"|Charlotte
| 65 || 28 || 27.2 || .470 || .365 || .716 || 5.2 || 2.3 || .9 || .9 || 10.3
|- class="sortbottom"
| style="text-align:center;" colspan="2"|Career
| 187 || 146 || 29.3 || .454 || .375 || .702 || 5.7 || 2.3 || .9 || 1.0 || 11.8

College

|-
| style="text-align:left;"| 2017–18
| style="text-align:left;"| Kentucky
| 37 || 30 || 27.4 || .519 || .238 || .606 || 5.7 || 1.5 || .8 || .8 || 10.8
|-
| style="text-align:left;"| 2018–19
| style="text-align:left;"| Kentucky
| 35 || 33 || 29.3 || .522 || .423 || .663 || 7.5 || 1.8 || .8 || 1.2 || 15.2
|- class="sortbottom"
| style="text-align:center;" colspan="2"| Career
| 72 || 63 || 28.3 || .521 || .384 || .632 || 6.6 || 1.7 || .8 || 1.0 || 12.9

References

External links
Kentucky Wildcats bio

1998 births
Living people
African-American basketball players
All-American college men's basketball players
American men's basketball players
Basketball players from Louisville, Kentucky
Basketball players from Texas
Charlotte Hornets draft picks
Charlotte Hornets players
Findlay Prep alumni
Kentucky Wildcats men's basketball players
McDonald's High School All-Americans
People from Frisco, Texas
Power forwards (basketball)
Sportspeople from the Dallas–Fort Worth metroplex
21st-century African-American sportspeople